Catoctin Creek is a  tributary of the Potomac River in Loudoun County, Virginia, with a watershed of . Agricultural lands make up 67 percent and forests 30 percent of Catoctin Creek's watershed.  It is the main drainage system for the northern Loudoun Valley, including all of the Catoctin Valley.

Course
The main arteries consist of the Catoctin and its North and South Forks.

North Fork Catoctin Creek 
State Route 9 follows the north fork westward as it flows through Hillsboro Gap in Short Hill Mountain at Hillsboro. From Wheatland the North Fork flows northeast.

South Fork Catoctin Creek 
The source of the  South Fork Catoctin Creek is just east of the Blue Ridge's Wilson Gap on the West Virginia border. From the source the South Fork flows southeast toward Purcellville, where it turns north and east toward Waterford, where it flows north again to its confluence with the North Fork.

Main Branch
The main branch of Catoctin Creek is formed by the confluence of its forks along the western edges of Catoctin Mountain north of Waterford and southeast of Milltown. The creek flows north along Catoctin Mountain's western side through the village of Taylorstown. Catoctin Creek continues meandering along the northern edge of Furnace Mountain and empties into the Potomac River to the north of the U.S. Highway 15 bridge across from Point of Rocks, Maryland.

See also 
List of rivers of Virginia

References

DeLorme, Yarmouth, Maine, Virginia Atlas and Gazetteer, Fourth Edition, 2000

External links 
Catoctin Creek Water Quality Implementation Plan

Rivers of Loudoun County, Virginia
Rivers of Virginia
Tributaries of the Potomac River